Statistics of the USFSA Football Championship in the 1901 season.

Tournament

Semifinals

Le Havre AC 6-1 Iris Club Lillois

Final 
Standard AC 1-1 Le Havre AC (match replayed)
Standard AC 6-1 Le Havre AC

References
RSSF

USFSA Football Championship
1
France